PSEI may refer to:
 Pseudaminic acid synthase, an enzyme
 PSE Composite Index, a Filipino stock market index